Bo Sven Gunnar Höglund (born 27 May 1948 in Huddinge, Stockholm County) is a Swedish actor.

Höglund has been employed at Östgötateatern in Norrköping and Linköping since 1983. He has toured with Riksteatern and acted in TV shows including , Nya tider, c/o Segemyhr and Rederiet. For four seasons he worked with Nils Poppe at Fredriksdalsteatern in Helsingborg. Höglund is best known for his role as Mats the waiter in the Martin Beck series.

Selected filmography
Beck – Den svaga länken (2007)
Beck – Enslingen (2002)
Beck – Sista vittnet (2002)
Beck – Kartellen (2002)
 2002 – Nya tider
 2001 – Skilda världar
 1998 – Rederiet
Beck – The Money Man (1998)
Beck – Monstret (1998)
Beck – Vita nätter (1998)
Beck – Öga för öga (1998)
Beck – Pensionat Pärlan (1997)
Beck – Mannen med ikonerna (1997)
Beck – Lockpojken (1997)
 1994 – Bröderna Östermans huskors
 1991 – Harry Lund lägger näsan i blöt!
 1990 – Fiendens fiende
 1989 – Offren
1983 & 1991 - Blomman från Hawaii (Theatre)

References

External links

1948 births
Swedish male actors
Living people